The 1997 AFL Ansett Australia Cup was the Australian Football League Pre-season Cup competition played in its entirety before the Australian Football League's 1997 Premiership Season began. It culminated in the final in March 1997.

Games

Round of 16

|- bgcolor="#CCCCFF"
| Home team
| Home team score
| Away team
| Away team score
| Ground
| Crowd
| Date
| Time
|- bgcolor="#FFFFFF"
| Adelaide
| 17.14 (116)
| Collingwood
| 9.8 (62)
| Football Park 
| 20,617
| Friday 21 February 1997
| 8:00 pm
|- bgcolor="#FFFFFF"
| Geelong
| 9.10 (64)
| West Coast
| 5.4 (34)
| Waverley Park
| 7,752
| Saturday, 22 February 1997
| 8:00 pm
|- bgcolor="#FFFFFF"
| Hawthorn
| 9.12 (66)
| Richmond
| 11.12 (78)
| Waverley Park
| 18,129
| Sunday, 23 February 1997
| 8:00 pm
|- bgcolor="#FFFFFF"
| North Melbourne
| 13.9 (87)
| Western Bulldogs
| 11.8 (74)
| Waverley Park
| 8,841
| Monday, 24 February 1997
| 8:00 pm
|- bgcolor="#FFFFFF"
| Melbourne
| 9.10 (64)
| Carlton
| 13.9 (87)
| Waverley Park
| 14,043
| Wednesday, 26 February 1997
| 8:00 pm
|- bgcolor="#FFFFFF"
| Port Adelaide
| 4.15 (39)
| Fremantle
| 11.9 (75)
| Football Park 
| 21,770
| Friday, 28 February 1997
| 8:00 pm
|- bgcolor="#FFFFFF"
| Sydney
| 10.7 (67)
| St Kilda
| 9.14 (68)
| Bruce Stadium
| 11,510
| Saturday, 1 March 1997
| 2:00 pm
|- bgcolor="#FFFFFF"
| Brisbane
| 15. 13 (103)
| Essendon
| 8.7 (55)
| The Gabba
| 13,745
| Monday, 3 March 1997
| 7:00 pm

Quarter-finals

|- bgcolor="#CCCCFF"
| Home team
| Home team score
| Away team
| Away team score
| Ground
| Crowd
| Date
| Time
|- bgcolor="#FFFFFF"
| Adelaide
| 7.10 (52)
| Geelong
| 11.14 (80)
| Football Park
| 22,425
| Sunday, 2 March 1997
| 8:00 pm
|- bgcolor="#FFFFFF"
| Richmond
| 9.9 (63)
| North Melbourne
| 22.10 (142)
| Waverley Park
| 20,747
| Friday, 7 March 1997
| 8:00 pm
|- bgcolor="#FFFFFF"
| Carlton
| 15.13 (103)
| Fremantle
| 9.11 (65)
| Waverley Park
| 8,135
| Saturday, 8 March 1997
| 8:00 pm
|- bgcolor="#FFFFFF"
| St Kilda
| 11.10 (76)
| Brisbane
| 11.7 (73)
| Waverley Park
| 13,745
| Sunday, 9 March 1997
| 8:00 pm

Semi-finals

|- bgcolor="#CCCCFF"
| Home team
| Home team score
| Away team
| Away team score
| Ground
| Crowd
| Date
| Time
|- bgcolor="#FFFFFF"
|  Geelong
| 14.13 (97)
| North Melbourne
| 14.12 (96)
| Waverley Park
| 14,404
| Friday, 14 March 1997 
| 8:00 pm
|- bgcolor="#FFFFFF"
| Carlton
| 12.11 (83)
| St Kilda 
| 10.13 (73)
| Waverley Park
| 25,940
| Saturday, 15 March 1997
| 8:00 pm

Final

|- bgcolor="#CCCCFF"
| Home team
| Home team score
| Away team
| Away team score
| Ground
| Crowd
| Date
| Time
|- bgcolor="#FFFFFF"
| Carlton
| 14.13 (97)
| Geelong
| 5.10 (40)
| Melbourne Cricket Ground
| 74,786
| Friday 21 March
| 8:00 pm

Final placings 

1.	Carlton 
2.	Geelong 
3.	North Melbourne 
4.	St Kilda 
5.	Brisbane 
6.	Adelaide 
7.	Fremantle 
8.	Richmond 
9.	Sydney 
10.	Western Bulldogs 
11.	Hawthorn 
12.	Melbourne 
13.	Collingwood 
14.	Essendon 
15.	West Coast 
16.	Port Adelaide

See also

List of Australian Football League night premiers
1997 AFL season

References

1997 Australian Football League season
Ansett Australia Cup, 1997
Australian Football League pre-season competition